The UEFA Women's Euro 1997 final was an association football match on 12 July 1997 at Ullevaal Stadion, Oslo, to determine the winner of UEFA Women's Euro 1997.

Background

Germany

Germany defeated Sweden in the semi final to reach the final.

Match

Summary

Germany won comfortably against Italy 2-0.

Final

References

External links
Official tournament website

Final
1997
1997
1997
July 1997 sports events in Europe